The Copeland steam bicycle was a steam powered, two-wheeled motor vehicle made by Lucius Copeland in 1881 and is sometimes classed as an early motorcycle.

Unlike typical penny-farthing bicycles, the Copeland had a small wheel at the front, which was turned by the handlebar for steering, and large wheel at the back.

In 1884 Copeland used an American Star bicycle, smaller steering wheel in front, to construct a new demonstration vehicle for the Maricopa County Fair that year. The "Star" was able to cover a mile in four minutes and to carry enough water to operate for an hour. Copeland set up the Northrop Manufacturing Co. in 1887 in Camden, New Jersey, to produce the a three-wheeled version, the "Phaeton Moto-Cycle", which he demonstrated at the Smithsonian Institution in Washington D.C in 1888. 

The steam-powered engine produced 4 horsepower at 2600 rpm with a  boiler around the steering column with the water heated by kerosene.

Surviving replicas

Peter Gagan, a former president of the Antique Motorcycle Club of America, was able to trace an 1884 "Star" bicycle with an original Copeland steam engine to the Phoenix Museum of History. Gagan took sufficiently detailed measurements to create a full-scale, working replica, which was hurriedly assembled to feature at the Guggenheim's 'The Art of the Motorcycle' Exhibition when it opened on The Las Vegas Strip in October 2001.  This finished replica of the original Copeland "Star" is now the oldest motorcycle design in operable condition in the world. This has inspired the Phoenix Museum of History to build a second Copeland replica, though it is not intended to be a working model.

References

External links
 Picture of Lucius Copeland and his steam bicycle in 1884
 Copeland's 'Steam Tricycle Patent 1887
 Advert for the Phaeton Moto-Cycle 1890

19th-century motorcycles
Steam motorcycles